The IPHWR-220 (Indian Pressurized Heavy Water Reactor-220) is an Indian pressurized heavy-water reactor designed by the Bhabha Atomic Research Centre. It is a Generation II reactor developed from earlier CANDU based RAPS-1 and RAPS-2 reactors built at Rawatbhata, Rajasthan. It can generate 220 MW of electricity. Currently, there are 14 units operational at various locations in India.  It is sometimes referred to as an small modular reactor due to its modularization.

The IPHWR design was later expanded into 540 MW and 700 MW designs, as well as the AHWR-300 design.

Reactor fleet

Technical specifications

See also
 India's three-stage nuclear power programme
 Nuclear power in India

References 

Nuclear power reactor types